Mortimer "Murt" Connor (born 1951) is an Irish retired Gaelic footballer who played as a left corner-forward for the Offaly senior team.

Born in Walsh Island, County Offaly, Connor first played competitive Gaelic football in his youth. He came to prominence at underage levels with the Walsh Island club. Connor later won a two Leinster medals and six championship medal with the Walsh Island senior team. He also played for Éire Óg.

Connor made his debut on the inter-county scene at the age of seventeen when he first linked up with the Offaly minor team. He later played for the under-21 team, winning a Leinster medal. Connor made his senior debut during the 1969-70 league. He went on to play a key role for Offaly in attack during a hugely successful era, and won two All-Ireland medals and three Leinster medals.

As a member of the Leinster inter-provincial team on a number of occasions, Connor failed to win a Railway Cup medal. Throughout his inter-county career Connor made 16 championship appearances. He retired from inter-county football during the 1975-76 league.

Connor is a member of a famous Gaelic football dynasty in Offaly. His father, Jim Connor, and his uncle, Tommy O'Connor, played with Offaly during the 1930s and 1940s, while his brothers, Matt, Richie and Séamus also played for Offaly throughout the 1970s and 1980s. His cousins, Liam O'Connor and Willie Bryan, were also All-Ireland medal winners with Offaly.

Honours

 Walsh Island
 Leinster Senior Club Football Championship (2): 1979, 1980
 Offaly Senior Club Football Championship (6): 1978, 1979, 1980, 1981, 1982, 1983

 Offaly
 All-Ireland Senior Football Championship (2): 1971, 1972
 Leinster Senior Football Championship (3): 1971, 1972, 1973 (sub)

References

1951 births
Living people
Walsh Island Gaelic footballers
Offaly inter-county Gaelic footballers
Leinster inter-provincial Gaelic footballers